The English Disco Lovers (EDL) was a Web movement, formed as a Google bombing campaign with the intention of replacing the far-right group The English Defence League as the top search engine result for "EDL". The website has since been taken down.

History
The English Disco Lovers was formed on 18 September 2012 by four anonymous London-based friends, who were discussing the appropriation of the initials EDL from the English Defence League and "putting it to better use". Some time after that they wrote a manifesto expressing their aim to oust the existing EDL from the top of Google's and Facebook's search results, aiming to achieve this via  search engine optimisation using a website, Twitter feed, and Facebook page.

In an emailed comment to The Guardian, they said:

References

External links

English Disco Lovers Facebook page
English Disco Lovers Twitter account

Internet memes introduced in 2012
Culture jamming
Internet-based activism
Anti-racism in the United Kingdom
Disco